Bruce Pirnie (born 20 September 1942, in Boston) is a Canadian former shot putter who competed in the 1972 Summer Olympics and in the 1976 Summer Olympics. He is a member of the Manitoba Sports Hall of Fame.

References

1942 births
Living people
Track and field athletes from Boston
Canadian male javelin throwers
Olympic track and field athletes of Canada
Athletes (track and field) at the 1972 Summer Olympics
Athletes (track and field) at the 1976 Summer Olympics
Doping cases in athletics
Canadian sportspeople in doping cases
Athletes (track and field) at the 1974 British Commonwealth Games
Athletes (track and field) at the 1975 Pan American Games
Pan American Games gold medalists for Canada
Pan American Games medalists in athletics (track and field)
Commonwealth Games medallists in athletics
Commonwealth Games bronze medallists for Canada
Medalists at the 1975 Pan American Games
Canadian male shot putters
Manitoba Sports Hall of Fame inductees
20th-century Canadian people
21st-century Canadian people
Medallists at the 1974 British Commonwealth Games